David Henrique Oliveira Batista (born 13 April 1986) is a Brazilian professional footballer who plays for Esporte Clube Taubaté.

References

External links 
 
 

1989 births
Living people
Association football forwards
Brazilian footballers
Campeonato Brasileiro Série B players
Campeonato Brasileiro Série C players
Primeira Liga players
Expatriate footballers in Ecuador
Expatriate footballers in Portugal
Comercial Futebol Clube (Ribeirão Preto) players
Paulista Futebol Clube players
Sampaio Corrêa Futebol Clube players
Gil Vicente F.C. players
Esporte Clube XV de Novembro (Piracicaba) players
Barretos Esporte Clube players
Volta Redonda FC players
Al-Mujazzal Club players
Clube do Remo players
Joinville Esporte Clube players
Clube Náutico Marcílio Dias players
Esporte Clube Taubaté players
Saudi First Division League players
Brazilian expatriate sportspeople in Saudi Arabia
Expatriate footballers in Saudi Arabia
Footballers from São Paulo